Our Raw Heart is the eighth studio album by American doom metal band YOB. It was released June 8, 2018, by Relapse Records.

Production
The album was produced by Billy Barnett. The album was inspired by a serious health issue suffered by singer and guitarist Mike Scheidt in early 2017, and most of the music was written while he was in a hospital bed. The album has been described as a cross between the band's two previous studio albums, mixing the aggression of Atma (2011) with the psychedelic experimentation of Clearing the Path to Ascend (2014). AllMusic classified it as a doom metal album "possessed of hope", with elements of sludge metal, stoner metal and post-metal psychedelia.

Critical reception
Our Raw Heart was well received by critics. At Metacritic, which assigns a weighted average rating out of 100 to reviews from mainstream publications, this release received an average score of 82 based on 10 reviews. Aggregator Album of the Year gave the release a 83 out of 100 based on a critical consensus of 9 reviews.

Metal Injection called the album "engaging and revealing, immediately appealing but with subtle nuances and layers that only become apparent after subsequent listens. It's a powerful and cathartic release," while Rolling Stone praised the band for "subvert[ing] doom's bleak conventions, painting the genre's slowpoke churn with uplifting melodies, cosmic textures and Scheidt's existential howl like a dreampop Dio." NPR Music said about the album: "the lightness is devastating."

Accolades

Track list

Personnel
 Mike Scheidt – vocal, guitars
 Aaron Rieseberg – bass
 Travis Foster – drums

Additional musicians
 Billy Barnett – piano

Charts

References

2018 albums
Relapse Records albums
Yob (band) albums